The Frog, the Dog and the Devil is a 1986 New Zealand short animated film. It was nominated for an Academy Award for Short Film (Animated) at the 59th Academy Awards.

Synopsis
Warning against the demon drink in an animated feature.

References

External links

1986 films
1980s New Zealand films
1986 animated films
1986 short films
1980s English-language films
National Film Unit